Gamasellodes is a genus of mites in the family Ascidae.

Species
 Gamasellodes adrianae Walter, 2003      
 Gamasellodes andhraensis Bhattacharyya, 2003      
 Gamasellodes bicolor (Berlese, 1918)      
 Gamasellodes claudiae Walter, 2003      
 Gamasellodes ericae Walter, 2003      
 Gamasellodes hildae Jordaan, 1988      
 Gamasellodes islandicus Bhattacharyya & Sanyal, 2003      
 Gamasellodes plaire Halliday, Walter & Lindquist, 1998      
 Gamasellodes spinosus Bhattacharyya & Sanyal, 2003      
 Gamasellodes sternalis Bhattacharyya & Sanyal, 2002      
 Gamasellodes vermivorax Walter, 1987      
 Gamasellodes vulgatior Athias-Henriot, 1961

References

Ascidae